Nasley Airton Lisboa de Souza, commonly known as Djalma (born 15 April 1988), is a Brazilian footballer who plays as an attacking midfielder.

Career
Born in Januária, Minas Gerais, Djalma graduated from América-MG's youth system, and made his senior debuts with lowly locals Patrocinense. After playing for Cristal he joined Santo André, being immediately loaned back to Patrocinense.

In July 2011 Djalma returned to Ramalhão, and played for the club in Série C. On 21 August 2012 he was loaned to Portuguese Primeira Liga side Gil Vicente in a two-year deal.

On 24 September 2012 Djalma played his first match as a professional, replacing compatriot Luís Carlos in the 74th minute of a 1–2 away loss against Sporting. He only appeared in six matches during the campaign, all from the bench, and was subsequently released.

After a brief period at São Paulo-RS, Djalma joined Grêmio Novorizontino in January 2014. In July, he moved to Série D's Jacuipense.

On 15 August 2014 Djalma joined Portuguesa until the end of the year. He appeared in four matches and scored once before being left out of the squad in October.

In December 2014, after being released by Lusa, Djalma joined Guarani-MG.

References

External links

1988 births
Living people
Sportspeople from Minas Gerais
Brazilian footballers
Association football midfielders
Campeonato Brasileiro Série B players
Campeonato Brasileiro Série C players
Campeonato Brasileiro Série D players
América Futebol Clube (MG) players
Esporte Clube Santo André players
Associação Portuguesa de Desportos players
Associação Atlética Coruripe players
Esporte Clube Taubaté players
Associação Desportiva Confiança players
Primeira Liga players
Gil Vicente F.C. players
Sport Club São Paulo players
Grêmio Novorizontino players
Esporte Clube Jacuipense players
Villa Nova Atlético Clube players
Agremiação Sportiva Arapiraquense players
Esporte Clube São Luiz players
Esporte Clube Pelotas players
Clube Atlético Patrocinense players
Guarani Esporte Clube (MG) players
America Football Club (Rio de Janeiro) players
Brazilian expatriate footballers
Brazilian expatriate sportspeople in Portugal
Expatriate footballers in Portugal